Brixworth railway station on the Northampton and Market Harborough railway opened on 16 February 1859 serving the village of Brixworth, Northamptonshire, England. It ran half a mile (c. 800 m) west of the village towards the village of Creaton along what remains as Station Road. It was part of the London and North Western Railway. Apart from the passenger service the line also enabled a large ironstone field near the village to be developed which had been an important consideration in developing the line.

The station lost its passenger service on 4 January 1960 and goods service on 1 June 1964. The line was re-opened for limited periods after that and not closed completely until 15 August 1981. Subsequently, the Heritage Northampton & Lamport Railway has been able to lease the trackbed and is restoring part of the route.

References

Disused railway stations in Northamptonshire
Former London and North Western Railway stations
Railway stations in Great Britain opened in 1859
Railway stations in Great Britain closed in 1960